In Greek mythology, more precisely in the epic tradition recounted in Homer's Odyssey, Dolius or Dolios (Ancient Greek: Δολίος) was a slave of Penelope whom she had received from her father Icarius on occasion of her marriage to Odysseus. He served as a gardener.

Family 
Dolius had at least seven sons, including Melanthius, and at least one daughter, Melantho. His wife was a slave from Sicily, whose name is not given.

Mythology 
After Odysseus' identity had finally been revealed, Dolius heartily welcomed Odysseus in his home, expressing great joy to see his master alive and well. Later, he and his six sons were among the loyal servants who joined Odysseus to stand against the relatives of the slain suitors.

See also 
 10989 Dolios, Jupiter trojan asteroid
 List of Greek mythological figures

Notes

Reference 
 Homer, The Odyssey with an English Translation by A.T. Murray, PH.D. in two volumes. Cambridge, MA., Harvard University Press; London, William Heinemann, Ltd. 1919. . Online version at the Perseus Digital Library. Greek text available from the same website.

Characters in the Odyssey